Salvador "Sal" Cuevas (1955 – April 9, 2017) was an American salsa bassist known for his association with the Fania All-Stars from 1978 to 1985. Although he also played the upright bass, he was one of the most popular electric bassists in the New York salsa scene, often playing in a funk style. "He was the first to bring the slaps and funk style that he learned from R&B, Funk, and Jazz music, into Salsa music."

Early life
Cuevas was born in Manhattan in 1955, and raised in The Bronx, New York City of Puerto Rican parents. He grew up in the streets of the South Bronx, where at the age of five his father began helping him develop his deep love of music by teaching him to play cords on the guitar.  The demographics of the city during the time provided Cuevas with an array of musical influences which he absorbed and later incorporated into his bass playing technique and style. At age 12 he played with his trio on the Milta Silva Show. “Being from New York you are exposed to not only the Latin part of music, you are also exposed to Rhythm and Blues, Punk, and also Jazz, so I started playing all of that stuff when I went to Junior High school,” he told ProjectNYE. “I spoke to my teacher and he said ‘why don’t you play the bass?'” For his high school years he attended the High School of Music & Art. At age 17, he began performing with Tony Pabon y La Protesta. After graduating high school he entered Mannes School of Music and left in his first semester when he was hired by Mongo Santamaria to join his world tour.

Career
Cuevas was a member of various notable salsa ensembles, including Los Kimbos, the Fania All-Stars and those of Johnny Pacheco, Héctor Lavoe and Willie Colón. During this time, he was also one of five bass players in New York City who recorded many of the "Jingles" for TV and radio; the others were Marcus Miller, Will Lee, Francisco Centeno and Neil Jason.
Cuevas performed and recorded with many salsa artists in New York for decades, before moving to Miami in his later years. While performing and recording, Cuevas worked as a New York City Corrections Officer, New York City Police Officer, Florida State Corrections Officer and ultimately retired as a Florida Police Seargent after he relocated to southern Florida. Cuevas enjoyed the title of musical director to Willie Colón's orchestra both during Willie's collaborations with famed Panamanian singer/songwriter/actor Rubén Blades and Willie's solo singing ventures.  He played bass on Billy Idol's hit "Eyes Without a Face" from the 1983 album Rebel Yell.

Style

The early to mid-1970s was a time when the electric bass guitar came of age with the likes of world-famous jazz bassist Jaco Pastorius and Stanley Clarke established the instrument as a solo voice. On Ray Barretto's album Ricanstruction where he takes solos alongside the horns. On a couple of tracks, he also uses sound modifying effects and foot pedals to add a different "color" to the sound of the bass. Cuevas is credited as being the innovator of Latin music bass playing when he first incorporated never before heard, nor utilized, Funk/Jazz/R&B/Rock styles and techniques on the instrument.

While maintaining the traditional flavor and concepts of authenticity within Latin music, he managed to fuse all those other "worlds" into his bass playing technique resulting in the creation of an innovative style. On some recordings for instance, he would play very intricate horn section lines or phrases on the bass in unison with the horns, which until then was virtually unheard of within the genre, as was his funky bass slapping and string snapping technique which today has become a norm for bassist within Latin "salsa" music thanks to Cuevas. He also incorporated the technique of "tapping" in his Latin bass playing.

On the electric upright bass, Cuevas incorporated techniques which also (until then) were completely unheard of in Latin music such as slides (glissandi), and utilizing the very upper ranges of the instrument, as heard on "La ceiba y la siguaraya", recorded with Celia Cruz and Sonora Ponceña.

Cuevas has performed and recorded with Ray Barretto, Joe Bataan, Willie Colon, Larry Harlow, Monguito, Johnny Pacheco, Louie Ramirez, Ralph Robles, Mongo Santamaria, Tony Pabon, Bobby Valentin, Héctor Lavoe, Adalberto Santiago, Pete "El Conde" Rodríguez, Ismael Miranda, Ray Maldonado, Ralph Marzan, Orestes Vilató, Roberto Rodriguez, Jose Rodriguez, and Barry Rogers, 
Tito Puente, Eddie Palmieri, Ricardo Ray, Jimmy Sabater, Celia Cruz, Machito, Ismael Miranda, Ismael Quintana, Cheo Feliciano, Tito Nieves, La India, Mongo Sanatamaria, Gloria Estefan, The Manhattans, Angela Bofil, Mandy More, Soledad Bravo, Jose Feliciano, Jon Lucien, Los Gaitanes, Billy Idol, Lenny Kravitz, Black Eyed Peas, Usher, Il Volo, Jon Secada, Frank De Vita, Cissy Houston, Kristy MacColl, Harry Belafonte, Ricky Martin, Jennifer Lopez, David Bisbal, Thalia, Los Llegales, Christian Castro, Oscar Deleon, Eddie Palmieri, Charlie Palmieri, Hector El Father, Obie Bermudez, Ricardo Montaner, Don Omar, Tego Calderon, Marc Anthony, Fernando Villalona, Papo Luca, Dave Valentin, Noel Pointer, Isaac Delgado, Airto & Flora Purim.

Death
Cuevas died on April 9, 2017, at Miami's Pembroke Pines Memorial Hospital. He had complications from diabetes and in previous days suffered a massive stroke and was left in a semicoma.

See also
 Salsa
 Charanga (Cuba)
 Afro-Cuban jazz
 Funk

External links
Sal Cuevas Discography at Discogs

References

1955 births
2017 deaths
People from Manhattan
American people of Puerto Rican descent
American double-bassists
Male double-bassists
Fania Records artists
Salsa musicians
Jazz fusion musicians
Avant-garde jazz musicians
Musicians from the Bronx
The High School of Music & Art alumni
American salsa musicians